Terry Fox Stadium, also known as the Terry Fox Athletic Facility  is an athletic field in Ottawa, Ontario, Canada, named after cancer research activist Terry Fox. It has a regulation-size natural grass soccer field, surrounded by a 400-metre track. Surrounding the track are bleachers with a capacity of approximately 2,000. It is located in Mooney's Bay Park, on the west side of Riverside Drive, south of Heron Road, which is south of downtown Ottawa.

The stadium hosted the track and field events at the 2001 Francophone Games. It has hosted the Pan American Combined Events Cup since 2012.

Facilities
The complex includes a polyurethane running track and three lighted natural grass sports fields. The fields are suitable for soccer, rugby, lacrosse, cross-country running, ultimate and other field sports.

Teams
Terry Fox Stadium has been the site of several professional soccer teams, including the Ottawa Intrepid, and Capital City F.C. It currently hosts the semi-pro League1 Ontario team Ottawa South United Force.

Usage
The track is the site of track and field training for public schools and universities in Ottawa. In the winter-time, the facility is adapted for cross-country skiing.

References

External links
 City of Ottawa site - Terry Fox Athletic Facility

Terry Fox
Sports venues in Ottawa
Soccer venues in Ontario
Multi-purpose stadiums in Canada
Athletics (track and field) venues in Ontario